Rhigopsis is a genus of broad-nosed weevils in the beetle family Curculionidae. There are at least two described species in Rhigopsis.

Species
These two species belong to the genus Rhigopsis:
 Rhigopsis effracta LeConte, 1874 i c g b
 Rhigopsis simplex Horn, 1894 c g
Data sources: i = ITIS, c = Catalogue of Life, g = GBIF, b = Bugguide.net

References

Further reading

 
 
 
 

Entiminae
Articles created by Qbugbot